Petronymphe is a genus of flowering plants endemic to Mexico. In the APG III classification system, it is placed in the family Asparagaceae, subfamily Brodiaeoideae (formerly the family Themidaceae).

The only known species is the bulbous plant Petronymphe decora, endemic to the State of Guerrero.

References

Monotypic Asparagaceae genera
Brodiaeoideae
Flora of Guerrero
Endemic flora of Mexico